Sweet Angel Mine is a 1996 thriller film directed by Curtis Radclyffe.

Plot 
Paul, a young man from London, arrives in the small Nova Scotia town of Milestone, where his long lost father was last seen years earlier. Paul is eager to find out what brought his father to this remote community. He meets Rauchine, a young, beautiful and unaffected girl who lives with her unstable mother and domineering grandmother on a nearby island, who is eking out a harsh and isolated living. Paul finds himself enmeshed in a web of jealousy, bitterness and fear as his attraction to Rauchine begins to grow. After a failed attempt to leave the island with Paul, Rauchine must make a crucial decision and break the cycle of violence and death that has marked her life.

Nominations and awards 
Won the International Fantasy Film Special Jury Award at Fantasporto 1997
Nominated for Best Film at Fantasporto 1997

References

External links 
 

1996 films
1996 thriller films
English-language Canadian films
British thriller films
Canadian thriller films
1990s Canadian films
1990s British films